"Perdido" is a jazz standard composed by Juan Tizol that was recorded on December 3, 1941 by Duke Ellington. However,  it is the January 21, 1942, recording of the song on the Victor label by the Ellington orchestra, of which Tizol was a member, that is regarded as the original recording. In 1944, Ervin Drake and Hans Lengsfelder were hired to write lyrics for the song.

Background
"Perdido" is Spanish and means lost, but also sloppy or indecent. The song refers to Perdido Street in New Orleans.

Ella Fitzgerald recording
"Perdido" was not usually sung with the Ellington band, the exception being Ella Fitzgerald on her 1957 album Ella Fitzgerald Sings the Duke Ellington Songbook.

Other recordings
Many others recorded the song, including: 
Sarah Vaughan
Dinah Washington
Art Tatum
Quincy Jones
The Charlie Parker Quintet
Dave Brubeck
Charles Mingus
Randy Weston
Erroll Garner
Bill Doggett
Harry James
Enoch Light and Light Brigade

References

External links
"Perdido" at JazzStandards.com
Standards Throwdown! (THE Greatest Standard of ALL-TIME!): Perdido "36 different artists recordings of Perdido, in a 'Standards Throwdown!'" at rdio.com

1941 songs
1940s jazz standards
Bebop jazz standards
Songs written by Ervin Drake
Songs with music by Juan Tizol